The White Pine Award is one of the annual literature Forest of Reading awards sponsored by the Ontario Library Association (OLA). 

Every year, 10 books are nominated for the award and students vote their favourite book.

The White Pine Nonfiction Award was discontinued after 2014.

Voting
In order to vote for the winner, one must register at the local branch library and read a minimum of 5 of the 10 nominated books. The program ends in April (of that year), with the voting day usually on April 18. Based on student voting across the province, the most popular book is then selected and author is honored with the White Pine Award. There are usually about 10 different nominees for the award every year.

Winners (Fiction) 
 2002 – Dancing Naked, written by Shelley Hrdlitschka. Published by Orca Book Publishers.
 2003 – A Foreign Field, written by Gillian Chan. Published by Kids Can Press.
 2004 – The First Stone, written by Don Aker. Published by HarperCollins.
 2005 – More Than You Can Chew, written by Marnelle Tokio. Published by Tundra Books.
 2006 – The Blue Girl, written by Charles De Lint. Published by Viking.
 2007 – Shattered, written by Eric Walters. Published by Viking/Penguin.
 2008 – Keturah & Lord Death, written by Martine Leavitt. Published by Red Deer Press.
 2009 – Little Brother, written by Cory Doctorow. Published by Tor Books/H.B. Fenn and Company.
 2010 – Mostly Happy, written by Pam Bustin. Published by Thistledown Press.
 2011 – The Monkeyface Chronicles, written by Richard Scarsbrook. Published by Thistledown Press.
 2012 – The Gathering, written by Kelley Armstrong. Published by Random House Canada/Doubleday Canada.
 2013 – Dark Inside, written by Jeyn Roberts. Published by Simon & Schuster.
 2014 – Live to Tell, written by Lisa Harrington. Published by Dancing Cat Books.
 2015 – Rush, written by Eve Silver. Published by HarperCollins Canada.
 2016 – The Bodies We Wear, written by Jeyn Roberts. Published by Knopf Books and Penguin Random House Canada.
 2017 – Fifteen Lanes, written by S. J. Laidlaw. Published by Tundra Books.
 2018 – Everything Beautiful Is Not Ruined, written by Danielle Younge-Ullman. Published by Razorbill Canada.
2019 – The Agony of Bun O'Keefe, written by Heather T. Smith. Published by Penguin Teen Publishing.
2020 – Sadie written by Courtney Summers. Published by St. Martin's Press.
2021 – Hunted by the Sky by Tanaz Bhathena.

Winners (Non-fiction)  
 2012 – The Book of Awesome, written by Neil Pasricha. Published by Penguin Group U.S.A./Amy Einhorn Books. 
 2014 – The Secret of the Blue Trunk, written by Lise Dion and Liedewij Hawke. Published by Dundurn.

See also
 Ontario Library Association
 Forest of Reading
 Forest of Reading Red Maple Award

Citations
 
 Burlington Public Library. "Award Winning Books." Burlington Public Library. 2009. Burlington Public Library. 19 Dec 2009 <http://www.bpl.on.ca/teens/read/awards/whitepine.htm>.
 Ontario Library Association. "White Pine Award." Ontario Library Association. 2009. Ontario Library Association. 19 Dec 2009. <http://www.accessola.com/ola/bins/content_page.asp?cid=92-263>.
 Ontario Library Association. "White Pine Award Winners." Ontario Library Association. 2009. Ontario Library Association. 19 Dec 2009. <http://www.accessola.com/ola/bins/content_page.asp?cid=92-263-265>.

Young adult literature awards
Awards established in 2002
2002 establishments in Ontario
2012 establishments in Ontario
Awards established in 2012
Awards disestablished in 2014
2014 disestablishments in Ontario